Evans Chan (陳耀成) is a Hong Kong Second Wave film director. His work usually focuses on exploring identities of Hong Kong people, such as To Liv(e) (1992), Crossings (1994), and The Map of Sex and Love (2001).

To Liv(e) is the most famous films among his works. In it the protagonist writes letter to famous Norwegian Liv Ullmann to express discontent about her criticisms of the Hong Kong Government's policies dealing with Vietnamese boat people. The film is a metaphor concerning the identity crisis of Hong Kong people in facing the 1989 Tiananmen Square protests and massacre and 1997 Handover.

To Liv(e) is widely acclaimed by academic scholars and film critics. The film received Best Actress (Lindzay Chan) and Best Supporting Actress (Josephine Koo) in Golden Horse Film Festival 1992.

Filmography
 Datong: The Great Society (2011)

External links
Evan Chan's website

Living people
Year of birth missing (living people)
Hong Kong film directors